

Events
Aimeric de Belenoi wrote , an Old Catalan planh for Nuño Sánchez

Births

Deaths
Blacasset (born unknown), troubadour

13th-century poetry
Poetry